Senator Ready may refer to:

Elizabeth M. Ready (born 1953), Vermont State Senate
Justin Ready (born 1982), Maryland State Senate